The discography of Lara Fabian, a Belgian-Canadian pop singer, consists of fourteen studio albums, four live albums, one compilation album, eight box sets, eight video albums, fifty two singles and a range of other album appearances. Being multilingual, Fabian sings in French, Italian, English, Spanish, Portuguese, Russian, Hebrew, Greek and German.

She has sold over 20 million records worldwide and is the best-selling Belgian-born female artist of all time. She is a lyric soprano with a vocal range that spans three octaves from C3 to G♯6 in live performances.

Albums

Studio albums

Live albums

Compilations

Box sets

Singles

As main artist

As featured artist

Promotional singles

Other appearances

Video albums

References

Discographies of Canadian artists
Discographies of Belgian artists
Pop music discographies